Haddon Fortnightly Club House is located in Haddonfield, Camden County, New Jersey, United States. The building was built in 1857 and added to the National Register of Historic Places on October 26, 1972.

See also
National Register of Historic Places listings in Camden County, New Jersey

References

Haddonfield, New Jersey
Houses on the National Register of Historic Places in New Jersey
Houses in Camden County, New Jersey
Houses completed in 1857
Clubhouses on the National Register of Historic Places in New Jersey
National Register of Historic Places in Camden County, New Jersey
New Jersey Register of Historic Places
1857 establishments in New Jersey